Diana of the Crossways is a novel by George Meredith which was published in 1885, based on the life of socialite and writer Caroline Norton.

Background
Diana of the Crossways was first serialized in the Fortnightly in 1884, then published as a book the following year. The book was Meredith's first popular novel; at least three editions of Diana of the Crossways would come out in 1885, and for many years it remained Meredith's most popular work. The book's popularity has been attributed in part to the boost in recognition that 1879's The Egoist gave Meredith, but also its roots in a high society scandal.

Meredith based the titular character of Diana on socialite, poet and novelist Caroline Norton, with whom he was acquainted, and the politics of the story on the troubled history of Robert Peel's administration and the 1845 Corn Laws. Norton had been accused of selling to The Times the news, allegedly told to her by admirer Sidney Herbert, of Peel's intent to repeal the laws. The story was later proven false, but its prominence in Meredith's fictionalized story drew significant credence to the claim. Beginning with the 1890 edition, Meredith added a disclaimer to the preface of the book that "the story of Diana of the Crossways is to be read as fiction."

Diana of the Crossways has been described as a feminist novel, and contemporary writers have drawn additional parallels between Diana's marriage and Meredith's similarly troubled marriage to his first wife Mary Ellen, the dissolution of which had deeply troubled him for several decades. Richard Cronin of the University of Glasgow argues that Meredith's choice to make Diana childless -- unlike Norton, whose political activism over losing custody of her sons famously led Parliament to pass several reforms concerning married women's rights -- stemmed from a desire to "avoid reflecting on the similarities between [George Norton's behavior] and his own behavior toward Mary Ellen."

Plot
Diana Warwick, beautiful, charming and intelligent but hotheaded, becomes embroiled in a political as well as a social scandal. She says: "We women are the verbs passive of the alliance, we have to learn, and if we take to activity, with the best intentions, we conjugate a frightful disturbance. We are to run on lines, like the steam-trains, or we come to no station, dash to fragments. I have the misfortune to know I was born an active. I take my chance." Her efforts to advance her husband, through cultivating a friendship with Cabinet Minister Lord Dannisburgh, lead to scandal and alienation from her husband, Augustus Warwick. Her intention to live "independently" through writing is initially successful, but her involvement in politics brings her to grief, both personal and public.

Adaptation
In 1922 the novel was adapted into a film Diana of the Crossways directed by Denison Clift and starring Fay Compton and Henry Victor.

See also

Caroline Norton
History of feminism

References

External links
 

1885 British novels
Feminism and history
Feminist novels
Novels by George Meredith
British novels adapted into films